FK Boka Metal Sutorina are a football club from Sutorina, Montenegro. They don't play in any competition since 2008, due to financial problems and all the players left the club. Club currently has only a young team.

See also
FK Boka Metal Sutorina stadion on Sutorinsko Polje at Panoramio

Defunct football clubs in Montenegro
Association football clubs established in 2001